Drug treatment may refer to:

the treatment of illness with pharmaceutical drugs
Drug rehabilitation, the treatment of substance dependence/drug addiction
Drug Treatment, an album by the Japanese band Kuroyume